Buschmann is  German-language surname. Notable people with the name include:

Anet-Jacqueline Buschmann (born 1982), Bulgarian rower
Christian Friedrich Ludwig Buschmann (1805–1864), German musical instrument maker
Johann Karl Eduard Buschmann (1805-1880), German philologist
Matt Buschmann (born 1984), American baseball player and coach
Marco Buschmann (born 1977), German politician

See also
Bushman (disambiguation)

German-language surnames